Crash is a 1974 Norwegian drama film written and directed by Rolf Clemens, starring Jan Solberg and Hanne Krogh. A motorcycle accident leaves the young Jan (Solberg) paralysed. This new situation challenges his attitude towards life, and his relationship both with his parents and with his girlfriend Marianne (Krogh).

External links
 
 

1974 films
1974 drama films
Norwegian drama films
1970s Norwegian-language films